Stone Raiders also known as Black Stone Raiders is an American blues rock and funk band.

Stone Raiders members are Jean-Paul Bourelly, a Chicago born jazz fusion and blues rock guitarist, Darryl Jones, also a Chicago born jazz and rock bass guitarist who also plays with The Rolling Stones, and Will Calhoun, an American drummer and a member of the group Living Colour.

References

External links 
 Official Stone Raiders website

African-American rock musical groups
American blues rock musical groups